Singers Glen is an Census-designated place (CDP) located in Rockingham County, Virginia, and situated between Little North Mountain and Interstate 81. Singers Glen is a historic settlement that is registered by both the Virginia Historic Landmarks Commission and the United States Department of the Interior. The community comprises one road (Singers Glen Road), the Singers Glen Post Office, a recycling center, the Singers Glen School, the Singers Glen Volunteer Fire Company, Singers Glen volunteer rescue squad, one store, and a Methodist and Baptist Church. It is listed as a CDP for the United States Census 2020.

History
Singers Glen was first settled in 1809 by Joseph Funk and other descendants of the German  Anabaptists who had been persecuted during the European Wars of Religion.  Funk was a well known music teacher and composer, and thanks largely to him, Singers Glen is sometimes considered the birthplace of gospel music in the American South.

The Joseph Funk House and Singers Glen Historic District are listed on the National Register of Historic Places.

Education
Singers Glen School operated from 1882 to 1973.

Emergency services
Singers Glen Volunteer Fire Company, serves  and at least 2,500 residents.

Religion
Singers Glen Cemetery overlooks the town from atop a hill. Access is available from Turleytown Road.

Singers Glen has more churches than commercial establishments. The churches in the Singers Glen area are Donovan Memorial United Methodist, Morning View Mennonite Church, Singers Glen Baptist Church, and Zion Hill Mennonite Church

Prominent residents and places
Glen Farm has occupied the same location for more than two centuries.
Joseph Funk founded the first Mennonite printing house in the United States here in 1847, best known for printing the Harmonia Sacra.

References

Mennonitism in Virginia
Unincorporated communities in Rockingham County, Virginia
Former municipalities in Virginia
Populated places established in 1809
1809 establishments in Virginia
Unincorporated communities in Virginia